Laurina Fleure (born 19 June 1981) is an Australian model and television personality. 

She competed in the second season of The Bachelor Australia in 2014 as well as the second season of I'm a Celebrity...Get Me Out of Here! in 2016. She won a "cult following" from her appearance on The Bachelor Australia. Fleure also appeared in the first season of Bachelor in Paradise Australia in 2018, where she entered in episode 2. She decided to quit in episode 7.

Fleure's modelling work has included fronting Brands Exclusive's "Celebrity Shopping, Reality Prices" campaign in 2016. 
Fleure dated Lewis Romano in 2015 and 2016 before splitting in October 2016.

References

1983 births
Living people
Australian female models
Models from Melbourne
Participants in Australian reality television series
Bachelor Nation contestants
I'm a Celebrity...Get Me Out of Here! (Australian TV series) participants